The Lawrence Israel Prize is awarded by the Interior Design Program of the Fashion Institute of Technology (FIT), New York City. The prize was named for and endowed by the architect Lawrence J. Israel.

The prize was first awarded in 1998 and has been bestowed annually since  "to an individual or firm whose ideas and work enrich FIT Interior Design students’ course of study". Every year the award winners are invited to give a public talk at FIT. FIT has recognized Johannes Knoops with a faculty award for  "...refreshing the Lawrence Israel Prize Lecture".

Recipients 
 1998 – Charles Gwathmey
 1999 – John F. Saladino
 2000 – Margo Grant Walsh
 2001 – Clodagh
 2002 – Billie Tsien
 2003 – Vicente Wolf
 2004 – Bromley/Caldari
 2005 – Adam D. Tihany
 2006 – Jamie Drake
 2007 – Lindy Roy
 2008 – AvroKO
 2009 – Gaetano Pesce
 2010 – LTL
 2011 – David Rockwell
 2012 – Diller Scofidio + Renfro
 2013 – Roman and Williams
 2014 – LOT-EK
 2015 – Tony Chi
 2016 – SHoP Architects
 2017 – Karim Rashid
 2018 – Annabelle Selldorf
 2019 – Alexandra Champalimaud

References 

Architecture awards